Namirembe Hill Side High School is a private co-educational, non-sectarian and prime senior school. it was started on  5 May 1995 at Bakuli (Namirembe) along Mujunja Road (Kampala District, Uganda). It started as an A-Level school with only sixty students. It was founded by Kiiza Hilary and Kyaligonza Robert.

Due to expansion pressure (1999), the school was shifted from Bakuli to Luteete (Wakiso District) eight miles from the city center. The school started up O-Level with two classes (Senior One and Senior Two) with only twenty five Pioneer students, and sat for their Uganda Certificate Examination in 2001.

Notable alumni
Humphrey Nabimanya, television presenter, founder and team leader at Reach A Hand, Uganda

References

Educational institutions established in 1995
Schools in Uganda
Wakiso District
1995 establishments in Uganda

Ugandan companies established in 1995